Vietnam women's national volleyball team represents Vietnam in international volleyball competitions and friendly matches. It is managed by the Volleyball Federation of Vietnam.

Competitions

Asian Championship
 1991 — 8th Place
 2001 — 7th Place
 2003 — 6th Place
 2005 — 8th Place
 2007 — 7th Place
 2009 — 7th Place
 2011 — 7th Place
 2013 — 6th Place
 2015 — 5th Place
 2017 — 5th Place
 2023 — TBA

Asian Cup
 2008 — 5th Place
 2010 — 7th Place
 2012 — 4th Place
 2014 — 8th Place
 2016 — 7th Place
 2018 — 5th Place
 2022 — 4th Place

Asian Games 
 2006 — 7th Place
 2018 — 6th Place
 2022 — TBD
 2026 — TBD
 2030 — TBD
 2034 — TBD

Asian Club Championship
 2023 — TBD

SEA Games
 1997 —  Bronze medal
 2001 —  Silver medal
 2003 —  Silver medal
 2005 —  Silver medal
 2007 —  Silver medal
 2009 —  Silver medal
 2011 —  Silver medal
 2013 —  Silver medal
 2015 —  Silver medal
 2017 —  Bronze medal
 2019 —  Silver medal
 2021 —  Silver medal
 2023 — TBD
 2025 — TBD
 2027 — TBD
 2029 — TBD
 2031 — TBD
 2033 — TBD

ASEAN Grand Prix
/ 2019 — 4th Place
 2022 —  Runner-up

VTV Cup
 2004 — 4th Place 
 2005 —  Runner-up
 2006 —  Runner-up
 2007 —  Winner
 2008 —  3rd Place
 2009 —  Winner
 2010 —  Winner
 2011 —  3rd Place
 2012 — 4th Place 
 2013 —  Runner-up
 2014 —  Winner
 2015 — 4th Place
 2016 —  Runner-up
 2017 —  3rd Place
 2018 —  Winner
 2019 —  Runner-up

Current squad
 Head coach:  Nguyễn Tuấn Kiệt
 Assistant coaches:
  Nguyễn Trọng Linh
  Tạ Đức Hiếu
  Trần Thị Thu Hiền

The following list consists of 18 players who are called for the 2023 tournaments:

Notes:
 OP Opposite Spiker
 OH Outside Hitter
 MB Middle Blocker
 S Setter
 L Libero

Youth teams
 Vietnam U23
 Vietnam U20
 Vietnam U18

See also
 Vietnam men's national volleyball team
 Volleyball Vietnam League

References

External links
 Official website
 Youtube
 FIVB profile

Videos
Vietnam women's national volleyball team Youtube.com video

Volleyball in Vietnam
Volley
National women's volleyball teams